Vanessa Fox O'Loughlin is an Irish  literary scout, agent and coach. She is also, as Sam Blake and Vanessa Fox, a published author.

Career
Vanessa Fox hails from St. Albans, Herts., UK.  She moved to Ireland with her fiancé, a member of the Irish police force, Shane O'Loughlin, living first in Bray, then in nearby Kilmacanogue, both in Co. Wicklow.

In 2006,  O'Loughlin moved from a career in event management to self-employment, founding Inkwell Writers Workshops to run fiction-writing workshops taught by bestselling published writers.  During the post-2008 Irish economic downturn, the company was renamed  The Inkwell Group and became a publishing consultancy, assisting new writers to move forward with their careers.  O'Loughlin published one romantic fiction novel as "Vanessa Fox," and publishes crime fiction as "Sam Blake."

In 2019 she was elected to the Management Committee of the Society of Authors  In 2022, O'Loughlin was one of over 100 authors to contribute to 100 Ways to Write a Book - a compilation of author interviews put together by author Alex Pearl during the Covid epidemic.

Sam Blake
In 2015 the Bonnier Twenty7 signed O'Loughlin to write a three-book series of crime novels featuring Garda detective Cat Connolly and set in Dublin.  The first book in the series was Little Bones, and was released, as were the two subsequent volumes, under the pen name Sam Blake. 'Little Bones' went straight into the Irish fiction bestseller list at first place and stayed there for four weeks, eventually featuring in the Irish top ten for eight weeks. In Deep Water and No Turning Back also entered the Irish bestseller lists.  All three were also released as audiobooks.

In January 2020 a standalone thriller Keep Your Eyes On Me was released by Corvus Books, together with an audio recording narrated by Harry Potter star Evanna Lynch from Bolinda Publishing. Keep Your Eyes On Me was also a No.1 Irish Times bestseller.
In January 2022 a new book, The Dark Room, was published by Corvus Book.

As Sam Blake, the author uses multiple communication channels, and hosts the 'Behind the Bestseller' podcast (Headstuff) featuring interviews with bestselling authors from multiple genres.

Writing.ie
O'Loughlin founded writing.ie in 2011; it developed into an Irish writers' web resource that covers literary events and offers advice to writers. The website continues to be developed and run by O'Loughlin.

The Irish Independent describes writing.ie as "a one-stop shop for authors."

References

Year of birth missing (living people)
Literary agents
Irish crime fiction writers
21st-century Irish writers
Living people